Emil Evert Bergström (born 19 May 1993) is a Swedish professional footballer who plays as a centre back for Polish club Górnik Zabrze.

Club career

Bergström made the move to Djurgården from IF Brommapojkarna as a youth player at the age of fifteen as he wanted to be at a bigger club. He had started out as a forward and then moved down to midfield before eventually finding his place in central defence. In 2010, he started getting a lot of playing time with the club's U21 team.

On 15 April 2011, Bergström made his Allsvenskan debut against Malmö FF as a substitute. Midway through the following 2012 Allsvenskan season Bergström had become a regular starter at the central defence position. On 30 June 2013, he scored his first league goal, which was also the historical last goal for Djurgården at Stockholms stadion before the club moved to their new home stadium Tele2 Arena.

On 4 February 2016, Bergström signed a contract with FC Rubin Kazan.

On 27 January 2017, he signed a loan contract with Grasshoppers that ran until the end of the 2017–18 season.

On 30 July 2018, he signed with FC Utrecht.

On 2 September 2019 FC Basel announced that Bergström was taken up on a loan contract until the end of the season. He played his first game for the club in the away game in the Swiss Cup on 15 September as Basel won 3–0 against FC Meyrin. He played his domestic league debut for the club in the home game at the St. Jakob-Park on 25 September as Basel won 4–0 against Zürich. The contract came to an end on 30 June and the club announced that they would not prolong it. During the ten months he was with the club, Bergström played a total 15 matches without scoring a goal. Eight of these games were in the Swiss Super League, one in the Swiss Cup, two in the UEFA Europa League and four were friendly games. 

On 1 July 2021, he moved on loan to Willem II.

After his contract with Utrecht concluded at the end of June 2022, Bergström remained a free agent until 26 September 2022, when he signed with Polish Ekstraklasa side Górnik Zabrze until the end of the season.

International career
Bergström has represented both the Sweden national under-19 football team and Sweden national under-21 football team. In January 2015 he played his first game with the Sweden national football team. The game was however not recognised as an official national team game by FIFA.

Personal life
Bergström grew up a Djurgårdens IF supporter from the age of three when his father started bringing him along to watch home games. He wears a protective mouthguard when he plays after getting his teeth knocked out by a spring rider when he was a child. His favourite number is 13.

Career statistics

Club

International

References

External links
 
 Djurgården profile 

1993 births
Living people
Association football defenders
Footballers from Stockholm
Swedish footballers
Sweden international footballers
Sweden youth international footballers
Sweden under-21 international footballers
Allsvenskan players
Russian Premier League players
Swiss Super League players
Eredivisie players
Ekstraklasa players
Djurgårdens IF Fotboll players
Spånga IS players
FC Rubin Kazan players
Grasshopper Club Zürich players
FC Utrecht players
Willem II (football club) players
Górnik Zabrze players
Swedish expatriate footballers
Expatriate footballers in Russia
Expatriate footballers in Switzerland
Expatriate footballers in the Netherlands
Expatriate footballers in Poland
Swedish expatriate sportspeople in Russia
Swedish expatriate sportspeople in Switzerland
Swedish expatriate sportspeople in the Netherlands
Swedish expatriate sportspeople in Poland